Blacktown Baseball Stadium is a baseball facility located in Rooty Hill, a suburb in Sydney, Australia.

Description
The Blacktown Baseball Stadium was built for the Sydney 2000 Olympic Games as the secondary baseball stadium. The stadium is now home to Baseball NSW and hosted the Claxton Shield between 2002 and 2006. It also hosted the showcase round of the 2009 Claxton Shield.

It is also home for the Sydney Blue Sox competing in the Australian Baseball League, who commenced their first season in November 2010.

See also
 Blacktown International Sportspark

References

External links
Blacktown International Sportspark

1999 establishments in Australia
Baseball in New South Wales
Baseball venues in Australia
Sports venues completed in 1999
Sports venues in Sydney

ko:블랙타운 야구장